Nungia is a genus of Asian jumping spiders containing 6 species. The name is derived from the Nùng people of Vietnam and China. The species name is derived from "epigyne".

Females have a light brown thorax, with a greyish-yellow opisthosoma and longitudinal rows of grey spots. Its legs are yellow, except for the stronger first pair, which are light brown except for the distal segments. They are only found in Asia.

, the World Spider Catalog accepted 6 species:
 Nungia epigynalis (Żabka, 1985) – China, Vietnam, Japan
 Nungia hatamensis (Thorell, 1881) – Malaysia, New Guinea
 Nungia modesta (Keyserling, 1883) – Australia (Queensland)
 Nungia papakula (Strand, 1911) – Indonesia (Aru Is.)
 Nungia tangi (Wang & Li, 2022) – China (Hainan)
 Nungia xiaolonghaensis (Cao & Li, 2016) – China

References

External links
 Salticidae.org: Diagnostic drawings

Salticidae genera
Salticidae
Spiders of Asia